The inauguration of John Adams as the second president of the United States was held on Saturday, March 4, 1797, in the House of Representatives Chamber of Congress Hall in Philadelphia, Pennsylvania. The inauguration marked the commencement of the only four-year term of John Adams as president and of Thomas Jefferson as vice president.  The presidential oath of office was administered to John Adams by Chief Justice Oliver Ellsworth. Adams was the first president to receive the oath of office from a Chief Justice of the United States,
and the first head of state to peacefully and legally succeed to office from a living predecessor since Louis I of Spain in 1724.

See also
Presidency of John Adams
1796 United States presidential election

References

External links
 
 Full textbartleby.com
 Full textYale Law School, Lillian Goldman Law Library
Corpus of Political Speeches, publicly accessible with speeches from United States, Hong Kong, Taiwan, and China, provided by Hong Kong Baptist University Library

United States presidential inaugurations
1797 in Pennsylvania
1797 in American politics
Presidency of John Adams
Speeches by John Adams